Pedro de Toledo is a municipality in the state of São Paulo in Brazil.

Geography
The southern part of the municipality is heavily forested and is part of the Serra do Mar mountain range. In the rest of the area there are farmlands and in the northern part there are hills and mountains. The neighboring municipality is Itanhaém to the east.

The municipality contains part of the  Serra do Mar Environmental Protection Area, created in 1984.
It contains a small part of the  Juréia-Itatins Ecological Station, a strictly protected area of well-preserved Atlantic Forest created in 1986.

References

External links
  http://www.pedrodetoledo.sp.gov.br
  http://www.guiapedrodetoledo.com
  citybrazil.com.br

Populated places established in 1949
Municipalities in São Paulo (state)